Dream Maker is the forty-fifth studio album by American country music singer Conway Twitty. The album was released in 1982, by Elektra Records.

Track listing

Charts

References

1982 albums
Conway Twitty albums
Elektra Records albums
Albums produced by Jimmy Bowen